Movatn Station is an unstaffed railway station on the Gjøvik Line at Movatn in Maridalen, Oslo, Norway.

In 1927 the station was upgraded with a station building and converted to a staffed station reserved for passengers and freight. In 1935 Movatn was officially designated a station. The station became remote controlled in 1971, and the following year it became unstaffed. In 1975 the station building was demolished.

The station lies at an altitude of  AMSL and has a small shack to protect waiting passengers. It has parking spaces for ten cars.

Sources
   Entry at Jernbaneverket 
  Norsk Jernbaneklubb.no (Norwegian Railway Association) – page about Movatn Station

Railway stations in Oslo
Railway stations on the Gjøvik Line
Railway stations opened in 1927
1927 establishments in Norway
Maridalen